Pemi Aguda is a Nigerian writer, architect, and podcast host. She won the 2020 Deborah Rogers Foundation Award.

Early life and career
Pemi Aguda was born in Nigeria and lives in Lagos, where she works as an architect. Aguda won the 2015 Writivism Short Story Prize and was the first recipient of the first Writivism Stellenbosch University writing residency.
 Her stories are published in Omenana Magazine, Saraba, The Kalahari Review, Black Fox Literary Magazine, The Wrong Quarterly and in Prufrock Magazine. Her work also appears in short story anthologies. In 2019 Aguda became a scholarship recipient of the Juniper institute and the 2019 Octavia E. Butler Memorial Scholarship.

Bibliography
Novels
Masquerade Season
Short stories
Things Boys Do
Anthologies
 These Words Expose Us
 Lagos Noir

References

Living people
Nigerian short story writers
21st-century Nigerian women writers
Nigerian women short story writers
Year of birth missing (living people)
University of Michigan alumni